William Irvine Estabrooks (born July 26, 1947) is a Canadian retired educator and politician from Nova Scotia.

A native of Sackville, New Brunswick, Estabrooks attended Mount Allison University from which he graduated in 1969. Estabrooks found employment as a teacher in the communities around Halifax, Nova Scotia, residing in the suburban community of Upper Tantallon. Estabrooks taught at various schools in Halifax including Sir John A. Macdonald High, Sackville High and Brookside Junior High. He has long been involved in local chapters of the Lions Club as well as volunteering with local hockey and football teams. He is also a recipient of the Lions International Presidents' Recognition Award and the Medal of Bravery from the Governor General.

In 2015, the Hubley Community Centre was named the Estabrooks Community Hall in Bill Estabrook's honour for his years of dedication to the community.

Political career
Estabrooks ran for the nomination of the Nova Scotia New Democratic Party in the riding of Timberlea-Prospect in 1998. He was elected in the 1998 Nova Scotia election and was subsequently re-elected in the 1999, 2003, 2006 and 2009 provincial elections.

Estabrooks was appointed to the Executive Council of Nova Scotia in June 2009 where he served as Minister of Transportation and Infrastructure Renewal and Minister of Energy until his resignation from cabinet in May 2012.

On September 10, 2010, Estabrooks announced that he had been diagnosed with Parkinson's disease in November 2008. He continued to serve in cabinet until his resignation on May 30, 2012. Estabrooks also announced his decision to not seek re-election in the next provincial election due to his health concerns.

References

Nova Scotia New Democratic Party MLAs
Living people
Members of the Executive Council of Nova Scotia
People from Sackville, New Brunswick
Mount Allison University alumni
1947 births
21st-century Canadian politicians
Canadian schoolteachers
People with Parkinson's disease